General elections were held in the Dominican Republic on 20 December 1962. They were the first after the end of the Trujillo dictatorship two years earlier, and are generally regarded to be the first free elections in the country's history.

Juan Bosch of the democratic socialist Dominican Revolutionary Party won the presidential election, whilst his party also won the Congressional elections. There was also an election for a Constituent National Assembly, which was to amend certain articles of the constitution. However, reforms implemented by Bosch alienated the American government and the local oligarchy, leading to a coup the following year, and eventually the Dominican Civil War. Voter turnout was 64.74% in the congressional elections and 65.16% in the presidential elections.

Results

President

Congress

References

Dominican Republic
1962 in the Dominican Republic
Elections in the Dominican Republic
Presidential elections in the Dominican Republic
December 1962 events in North America